Scotts Crossing is an unincorporated community in Allen County, in the U.S. state of Ohio.

History
A post office called Scotts Crossing was established in 1873, and remained in operation until 1909. Besides the post office, Scotts Crossing had a country store.

References

Unincorporated communities in Allen County, Ohio
1873 establishments in Ohio
Populated places established in 1873
Unincorporated communities in Ohio